Steak: Music From The Motion Picture is a 2007 album by Sébastien Tellier, Mr. Oizo and SebastiAn. It is the soundtrack to the film Steak directed by Quentin Dupieux (Mr. Oizo) starring Eric Judor, Ramzy Bedia, Jonathan Lambert, Vincent Belorgey and Sebastian Akchoté.

Track listing
Adapted from Apple Music

References

External links 
 

2007 soundtrack albums
Film soundtracks